David Ginsburg (18 March 1921 – 18 March 1994) was a British politician.

Ginsburg was educated at University College School, Hampstead, and Balliol College, Oxford. During his time at Oxford University, he was chair of the Oxford University Democratic Socialist Club. He was an economist and market research expert and was secretary of the Labour Party's research department.

At the 1959 general election, he was elected Member of Parliament (MP) for Dewsbury in the West Riding of Yorkshire.

In 1981, Ginsburg was among the Labour MPs who defected to the new Social Democratic Party. In 1983, he polled 25% of the vote in Dewsbury, coming third and possibly having the effect of splitting the Labour vote and helping the Conservative candidate John Whitfield win.

Ginsburg died in 1994 on his 73rd birthday.

References

Sources 
Times Guide to the House of Commons, 1966 & 1983

1921 births
1994 deaths
People educated at University College School
Alumni of Balliol College, Oxford
Labour Party (UK) MPs for English constituencies
Social Democratic Party (UK) MPs for English constituencies
UK MPs 1959–1964
UK MPs 1964–1966
UK MPs 1966–1970
UK MPs 1970–1974
UK MPs 1974
UK MPs 1974–1979
UK MPs 1979–1983
Jewish British politicians